Jayavarman VII, posthumous name of Mahaparamasaugata (c. 1122–1218), was king of the Khmer Empire. He was the son of King Dharanindravarman II (r. 1150–1160) and Queen Sri Jayarajacudamani.
 He was the first king devoted to Buddhism, as only one prior Khmer king was a Buddhist. He then built the Bayon as a monument to Buddhism. Jayavarman VII is generally considered the most powerful of the Khmer monarchs by historians. His government built many projects including hospitals, highways, rest houses and temples.  With Buddhism as his motivation, King Jayavarman VII is credited with introducing a welfare state that served the physical and spiritual needs of the  Khmer people.

Defeat of the Cham and coronation 

In 1177 and again in 1178, the Cham invaded the Khmer Empire. In 1177, Champa King Jaya Indravarman IV launched a surprise attack on the Khmer capital by sailing a fleet up the Mekong River, across Lake Tonlé Sap, and then up the Siem Reap River, a tributary of the Tonle Sap.  The invaders pillaged the Khmer capital of Yasodharapura and put king Tribhuvanadityavarman to death. Also in 1178, when he was in his mid 50s,  Jayavarman came to historical prominence by leading a Khmer army that ousted the invaders, which included a naval battle depicted on the walls of the Bayon and Banteay Chmar.  Returning to the capital, he found it in disorder.  He put an end to the disputes between warring factions and in 1181 was crowned king himself.

Early in his reign, he probably repelled another Cham attack and quelled a rebellion of the vassal Kingdom of Malyang (Battambang).  He was greatly helped by the military skill of refugee Prince Sri Vidyanandana, who also played a part in the subsequent sacking and conquest of Champa (1190–1191). 
His conquest of Champa made it a dependency of the Khmer Empire for thirty years.  Jayavarman expanded Khmer control of the Mekong Valley northward to Vientiane and to the south, down the Kra Isthmus.

Public works and monuments

Over the 37 years of his reign, Jayavarman embarked on a grand program of construction that included both public works and monuments.  As a Mahayana Buddhist, his declared aim was to alleviate the suffering of his people.  One inscription tells us, "He suffered from the illnesses of his subjects more than from his own; the pain that affected men's bodies was for him a spiritual pain, and thus more piercing." This declaration must be read in light of the undeniable fact that the numerous monuments erected by Jayavarman must have required the labor of thousands of workers, and that Jayavarman's reign was marked by the centralization of the state and the herding of people into ever greater population centers.

Historians have identified many facets in Jayavarman's intensive building program.  In one phase, he focused on useful constructions, such as his famous 102 hospitals, rest houses along the roads, and reservoirs. Thereafter, he built a pair of temples in honor of his parents: Ta Prohm in honor of his mother and Preah Khan in honor of his father.

Finally, he constructed his own "temple-mountain" at Bayon and developed the city of Angkor Thom around it.  He also built Neak Pean ("Coiled Serpent"), one of the smallest but most beautiful temples in the Angkor complex, a fountain with four surrounding ponds set on an island in that artificial lake.

The Prah Khan inscription states that the King erected Buddha stone images, the Jayabuddhamahanatha, in twenty-three towns in different parts of his empire. Among those towns were Lavodayapura (modern Lopburi), Svarnapura, Sambukapattana, Srijayarajapuri (modern Ratchaburi), Srijayasimhapuri (modern Kanchanaburi) and Srijayavajrapuri (modern Phetburi), believed to have been situated more.

Ta Prohm
In 1186, Jayavarman dedicated Ta Prohm ("Eye of Brahma") to his mother from Pimai in Thailand.  An inscription indicates that this massive temple at one time had 80,000 people assigned to its upkeep, including 18 high priests and 615 female dancers.

Angkor Thom and Bayon
Angkor Thom ("Grand Angkor" or "Angkor of Dham(ma)") was a new city centre, called in its day Indrapattha.  At the centre of the new city stands one of his most massive achievements—the temple now called the Bayon, a multi-faceted, multi-towered temple that mixes Buddhist and Hindu iconography. Its outer walls have startling bas reliefs not only of warfare but the everyday life of the Khmer army and its followers.  These reliefs show camp followers on the move with animals and oxcarts, hunters, women cooking, female traders selling to Chinese merchants, and celebrations of common foot soldiers.  The reliefs also depict a naval battle on the great lake, the Tonle Sap.

Popular Icon 
Jayavarman VII's bust has been a favorite of khmer households and a masterpiece of the National Museum for many years. The recent discovery of portions of the rest of his statue confirmed speculations about his spiritual aura as a sovereign.

Chronology

King Suryavarman (Sun Shield) II, builder of the great Angkor Wat, died in 1150.  He was succeeded by Dharanindravarman II, who ruled until 1160. Due to the absence of Jayavarman VII, Yashovarman II succeeded the throne, who was himself overthrown by Tribhuvanadityavarman (Protegee of the Sun of three worlds), assumed to be an usurper.  In 1177, the Chams, led by Jaya Indravarman IV, invaded and Angkor was sacked. Nonetheless, this date, not to mention the event itself, has been questioned by Michael Vickery, who doubts the reliability of the Chinese sources for this period.  In 1181 Jayavarman VII became king after leading the Khmer forces against the Chams.  Jayavarman VII then exacted vengeance against Champa in 1190, for the earlier raid in 1177.

Jayavarman died around 1218.  He was succeeded by Indravarman II, who died by 1243.  Indravarman was succeeded further by Jayavarman VIII, a Shivaite.  He embarked on the destruction or defacement of Jayavarman VII's Buddhist works. The niches all along the top of the wall around the city contained images of the Buddha, and most of these were removed.  This included the great statue of Buddha at Bayon, and the Buddha images in Angkor Thom, which were converted into linga.

Legacy
The history of the Khmer empire cannot be read in the manner of European patterns of kingship, inheritance or nationhood. The sons of a Khmer king did not necessarily inherit their father's thrones; Jayavarman VII himself had many sons, such as Suryakumara and Virakumara (the suffix kumara usually is translated as "prince", one of the king's sons), and Srindrakumaraputra, the crown prince who died before his father, but only Indravarman II inherited the throne.

Jayavarman VII built 121 "houses with fire" rest houses built every fifteen kilometers along raised highways for travellers, and 102 hospitals.  His was the "Buddhism of the Greater Vehicle".  However, Brahmans continued to play a "role at court", with Hrishikesa being made chief priest, with the title Jayamahapradhana.

He married Princess Jayarajadevi and then, after her death, married her sister Indradevi. The two women are commonly thought to have been a great inspiration to him, particularly in his strong devotion to Buddhism.

Though he had many sons, we know the names of only four, Suryakumara (mentioned in Ta Prohm), Virakumara (mentioned in Preah Khan), Srindrakumara (mentioned in Banteay Chhmar), and Tamalinda (later became a bhikku). He also be the father of Sikhara Mahadevi chief consorts of Pho Khun Pha Mueang that appear in Stele of Wat Sri choom Script of Sukhothai Historical Park.

In popular culture
 Jayavarman VII appears as downloadable content for the 4X video game Civilization VI, where he leads the Khmer civilization.

See also

 History of Cambodia
 List of monarchs of Cambodia

References
 Jean Boiselier: Refléxions sur l'art du Jayavarman VII., BSEI (Paris), 27 (1952) 3: 261-273.
 Georges Coedès: Un grand roi de Cambodge - Jayavarman VII., Phnom Penh 1935.
 Georges Coedès: Les hôpitaux de Jayavarman VII., BEFEO (Paris), 40 (1940): 344-347.
 Louis Finot: Lokésvara en Indochine, Paris: EFEO, 1925.
 Paul Mus: Angkor at the Time of Jayavarman VII., Bulletin de Société des Études Indochinoises (Paris), 27 (1952) 3: 261-273.
 Jan Myrdal/Gun Kessle: Angkor - An Essay on Art and Imperialism, New York 1970.
 Philippe Stern: Les monuments du style de Bayon et Jayavarman VII., Paris 1965.

A fictionalised account of the life of Jayavarman VII forms the basis of one thread of Geoff Ryman's 2006 novel The King's Last Song.

Notes

External links
 History of Jayavarman VII
 Article: Are Ancient Goddesses Actually 12th Century Khmer Queens?

|  style="width:25%; text-align:center;"|Preceded by:Tribhuvanadityavarman
|  style="width:25%; text-align:center;"|King of the Khmers1181–1218
|  style="width:25%; text-align:center;"|Succeeded by:Indravarman II

 
12th-century Cambodian monarchs
Cambodian Buddhist monarchs
Khmer Empire
1120s births
1218 deaths
Converts to Buddhism from Hinduism
Khmer people
13th-century Cambodian monarchs